Bakersfield is the thirteenth studio album by American country music artist Vince Gill and steel guitar player Paul Franklin. It was released on July 30, 2013, via MCA Nashville. The album is a collaborative tribute of Merle Haggard and Buck Owens songs. It reached number 4 on Top Country Albums.

Content
Vince Gill and his fellow The Time Jumpers band member Paul Franklin re-recorded songs by Buck Owens and Merle Haggard as a tribute, pulling five songs from each artist, all from 1961 -1974.

Critical reception
Bakersfield has received positive reviews from music critics. Metacritic assigns an average score out of 100 from reviews and ratings from mainstream critics. The album received a metascore of 80, based on 5 reviews.

Billy Dukes at Taste of Country rated the album 4 out of 5 stars. He states, "Gill and Franklin work like a polished vocal duo, only the pedal steel is Franklin’s voice," and goes on to say, "the album’s production is notable for being crystal clear. Each instrument stands out without stepping out." He finishes by saying, "You’ll struggle to find two more professional, humble musicians in Nashville, and those qualities — along with a top notch band and great songs — make for a very satisfying listen."

Daryl Addison from Great American Country also positively reviewed the album. Addison states, "the pair exhibits a palpable chemistry that breathes new life into each one of the album’s songs" and "surround themselves with top-notch players" He finishes by saying, "This artistic give and take, set inside classic and well-known songs, makes the album feel alive and new."

Track listing

Personnel 
 Vince Gill – lead vocals, acoustic guitar, electric lead guitar (1, 2, 4, 5, 7–10), harmony vocals (1, 2, 4, 5, 7–10)
 Paul Franklin – pedal steel guitar
 J. T. Corenflos – electric rhythm guitar 
 John Hobbs – keyboards (1, 3–10), acoustic piano (2)
 Willie Weeks – bass guitar (1, 2, 4, 5, 6, 8, 9, 10)
 Brad Albin – upright bass (3, 7)
 Greg Morrow – drums
 Kenny Sears – fiddle (1, 7)
 Larry Franklin – fiddle (9)
 Joe Spivey – fiddle (9)
 Dawn Sears – harmony vocals (2, 4, 8, 10)

Production 
 Vince Gill – producer 
 Paul Franklin – producer 
 Justin Niebank – recording, mixing 
 Matt Rausch – additional recording, recording assistant, mix assistant 
 Drew Bollman – recording assistant, mix assistant 
 Andrew Mendleson – mastering 
 Natthaphol Abhigantaphand – mastering assistant 
 Daniel Bacigalupi – mastering assistant 
 Adam Grover – mastering assistant 
 LeAnn Bennett – production coordinator
 Mike "Frog" Griffith – production coordinator 
 Karen Naff – art direction
 Craig Allen – design 
 Aaron Johnson (Anderson Design Group) – illustration 
 Jim Wright – photography 
 Debra Wingo – hair, make-up 
 Merle Haggard – liner notes 
 The Fitzgerald Hartley Co. – management

Chart performance
The album debuted at No.4 in the Top Country Albums chart with 11,000 copies sold. The album has sold 56,000 copies in the US as of February 2014.

Album

References

External links
Road to Bakersfield - Vince Gill & Paul Franklin

2013 albums
Vince Gill albums
MCA Records albums